Solheim is a Norwegian word and surname meaning "home of the Sun". It may refer to:

Places

Iceland
Sólheimajökull, a glacier in southern Iceland between the volcanoes Katla and Eyjafjallajökull

Norway
Solheim, Vestland, a village in Gloppen municipality in Vestland county
Solheim, Bergen, a village in Bergen municipality (north of Minde, Bergen) in Vestland county
Solheim, Nordland, a village in Steigen municipality in Nordland county

United States
E. H. Hobe House-Solheim or Solheim, a house in White Bear Lake, Minnesota

Netherlands
Villa Solheim, home to 24 fraternity students in Delft, South Holland

People
Solheim (surname)

Other uses
Solheim Cup, biennial golf tournament for professional women golfers, named for Karsten Solheim
Solheim IF, former Norwegian football club from Lørenskog